is a 2021 Japanese animated slice of life science fiction film, produced by J.C.Staff and directed by Yasuhiro Yoshiura. It premiered in Japan in October 2021.

Plot
The film takes place in a unspecified near future in a small Japanese town, which the technology company Hoshima uses as test site for multiple AI controlled systems and robot. The story follows high school student Satomi Amano, who lives with her mother, the Hoshima employed AI specialist Mitsuko Amano. After a past incident, Satomi is isolated at school, shunned by her classmates, and estranged from her childhood friend Toma. Her mother is preparing a secret test of a newly developed AI system, which is supposed to be indistinguishable from humans. In this test, the AI is to spend a few days in Satomi's class in a realistic looking robotic body as exchange student Shion Ashimori. Shortly after having been introduced to the class, Shion surprises everyone by recognising Satomi, asking her whether she is happy, and breaking into song. In the following days, Shion is bent on making Satomi happy. She helps Satomi find friends, helps these friends with their problems, and goes on to fix Satomi's relationship to Toma, all with the power of song. Meanwhile, it becomes clear that someone mysteriously manipulates the recordings of the school's security system and Shion's telemetry results to hide Shion's unconventional behavior from Hoshima. When the company eventually gets wind of this, Shion is violently taken in and prepared for deletion. But Satomi and her friends decide to rescue her, and Shion's mysterious link to Satomi is revealed.

Characters

Production

Sing a Bit of Harmony was announced by Funimation, as a co-production with J.C.Staff, on September 10, 2020. The film is directed by Yasuhiro Yoshiura. Yoshiura and Ichirō Ōkouchi co-wrote the script, Kanna Kii drew the original character designs, Shuichi Shimamura designed the characters for animation and is also the chief supervising animator, and Hidekazu Shimamura served as supervising animator. Ryo Takahashi composed the music and Yohei Matsui wrote the songs. On April 6, 2021, Funimation posted a trailer for the film.

Release

Sing a Bit of Harmony premiered in Japan on October 29, 2021. The film had its international premiere on October 2, 2021, at the Scotland Loves Animation film festival, held at the Glasgow Film Theatre. Funimation will screen the film, in both subbed and dubbed formats, in the United States and Canada on January 23, 25 and 26; in Australia and New Zealand starting on January 27; in the United Kingdom and Ireland starting on January 28.

Manga adaptation
A manga adaptation, illustrated by Megumu Maeda, was serialized in Kodansha's seinen manga magazine Monthly Afternoon from June 24, 2021, to July 26, 2022. Its first tankōbon volume was released on October 21, 2021.

Reception

In October 2021, Sing a Bit of Harmony won the Audience Award at the Scotland Loves Animation film festival. It is also won the Best Animation Film Award at the New York City Film & Television Festival 2021, entered finalist of New York Animation Film Awards 2021 Best Animation Feature Film. In Japan, it is also nominated for the Excellent Animation of the Year in Japan Academy Film Prize 2022. 

Sing a Bit of Harmony grossed $50,490 at the box office.

References

External links
  
  
 
 

2021 anime films
Android (robot) films
Anime with original screenplays
Films about artificial intelligence
Films with screenplays by Ichirō Ōkouchi
Japanese animated feature films
Funimation
J.C.Staff
Science fiction anime and manga
Seinen manga
Shochiku
Slice of life anime and manga